Taras Shevchenko Place is a street in New York City named after Taras Shevchenko, who is commonly considered to be one of the greatest Ukrainian poets. Taras Shevchenko Place connects 6th Street and 7th Street between Second and Third Avenues in the East Village. It abuts the back of 41 Cooper Square to the west.

Namesake

Taras Shevchenko (1814-1861) was a Ukrainian writer, painter and political activist whose novels and poems, written in Ukrainian, gave forceful expression to his countrymen's national sentiment at a time when many aspects of their culture, especially the language, were being suppressed by the Russian Empire. In one of his poems, he called for an independent Ukrainian state to be led by a "Ukrainian Washington".

Other names

The street was originally known as Hall Street and then as Hall Place, after Charles Henry Hall, a Harlem landowner who sold the property to the city on Dec. 23, 1828. City Council changed the name of Hall Place to Taras Shevchenko Place in 1978. There was an attempt in 2001 by the Cooper Union to rename the street back to Hall Place, by "de-mapping" the Taras Shevchenko name. A "Hall Place" street sign was re-installed in 2010.

References

External links
 

Streets in Manhattan
Ukrainian communities in the United States
East Village, Manhattan